Tithoes is a genus of beetles belonging to the family Cerambycidae.

Species
The following species are recognised in the genus Tithoes:
 Tithoes confinis (Laporte de Castelnau, 1840)
 Tithoes congolanus (Lameere, 1903)
 Tithoes digennaroi Bouyer, 2016
 Tithoes drumonti Bouyer, 2016
 Tithoes frontalis Harold, 1879
 Tithoes hassoni Bouyer, 2016
 Tithoes maculatus (Fabricius, 1792)
 Tithoes morettoi  Bouyer, 2016
 Tithoes orientalis (Lameere, 1903)
 Tithoes somalius (Lameere, 1903)
 Tithoes yolofus (Dalman, 1817)

References

 Biolib
  F. VITALI - Cerambycoidea

Prioninae